Brechin  is a station in Angus, on the Caledonian Railway line.

History
The station opened for business on 1 February 1848. Initially four trains per day ran between Brechin and Montrose. The fare between Brechin and Montrose was 1s.4d First Class, 1s. Second Class and 8d Third Class.

The station buildings were constructed between 1847 and 1848. By 1872 there were complaints about the state of the station and the lack of comfortable accommodation for passengers. However, nothing was done until the Caledonian Railway purchased the Forfar and Brechin Railway in 1893. The new owners then planned a major extension, largely prompted by the imminent arrival of the Brechin and Edzell District Railway.  They began negotiation with Brechin Town Council for the purchase of land and widening of streets. The changes started in 1895 with the expansion of the goods department on land purchased by the company from the Town Council in Strachan's Park. They station passenger accommodation was then extended between 1897 and 1898 to designs by Thomas Barr, District Engineer of Perth.

During the extension works there was a serious accident at the station on 27 August 1895. A passenger service from Forfar due in at 9.00am failed to stop at the platform and crashed through the terminus and ended up on the roadway leading to the goods station. A number of passengers on the train sustained severe shock, but fortunately there were no injuries. A Board of Trade enquiry was held on 10 September 1895 by Colonel George William Addison R.E. 

Shortly after the station was extended there was a serious accident on 2 November 1898. The driver of a goods train from Forfar consisting of engine no. 521, a six-wheeled locomotive with a 6 wheeled tender, 30 loaded cattle trucks and a brake van lost control of his train when descending the incline towards the station. It struck the buffer stops at the end of the line and demolished them, crossed the platform behind the stops and went through the stone wall of the station building and came to rest in the booking hall. Several columns were destroyed and a section of the platform canopy collapsed. The driver and fireman managed to jump clear before the engine left the rails and were not badly injured. Eleven cattle trucks were wrecked at 88 head of cattle were killed or injured.  The blame was placed on the driver, John Habenton, for not exercising control over his train.

The station closed to passenger traffic on 4 August 1952. The last train on the branch line was the 6.13 pm train from Montrose which was made up of three first-class coaches. Passenger services on the Forfar-Brechin and Brechin-Bridge of Dun-Montrose line were withdrawn to save £11,000 per annum.

Modern day 
In 2023, a footbridge manufactured in 1877 and formerly located in Glasgow will be reconstructed at the station.

Stationmasters

James Petrie ca. 1851 ca. 1867
Richard Hermon ca. 1874 - 1879 (afterwards station master at Montrose)
Robert Elliott 1879 - 1920
David Smythe 1920 - 1924 (afterwards station master at Forfar)
Alexander Farquharson 1924 - 1934 (formerly station master at Dunning)
David Lithgow 1934 - 1943 (afterwards station master at Dumbarton)
David M. Tyndall 1943 - 1949 (afterwards station master at Lockerbie)
George A. Cumming 1949 - 1950 (afterwards station master at Aviemore)
Robert Turnbull 1950 - 1953 (formerly station master at Kyle of Lochalsh)
James H. Brown 1953 - 1961 (formerly station master at Aboyne)

References

Sources
 
 
 Caledonian Railway (Brechin) Ltd

Heritage railway stations in Angus, Scotland
Former Caledonian Railway stations
Railway stations in Great Britain opened in 1848
Railway stations in Great Britain closed in 1952
Brechin
Listed railway stations in Scotland
Category B listed buildings in Angus, Scotland